Franklin is a city in Merrimack County, New Hampshire, United States. At the 2020 census, the population was 8,741, the least of New Hampshire's 13 cities. Franklin includes the village of West Franklin.

History
Situated at the confluence of the Pemigewasset and Winnipesaukee rivers that form the Merrimack River, the town was settled by Anglo-European colonists in 1764 and originally known as "Pemigewasset Village". It was taken from portions of Salisbury, Andover, Sanbornton and Northfield. The name "Franklin" was adopted in 1820 in honor of statesman and founding father Benjamin Franklin. Water power from the falls on the Winnipesaukee River helped it develop as a mill town. It incorporated as a town in 1828, and then as a city in 1895.

Daniel Webster was born in a section of Franklin that was then part of Salisbury. There is a state historic site located off Route 127 that preserves the famous orator's childhood home. As an adult, Webster owned "The Elms", a farm near the Merrimack River along present-day Route 3.

In 1943, the Army Corps of Engineers created the Franklin Falls Reservoir above Franklin by constructing the Franklin Falls Dam for flood control on the Pemigewasset River.

Image gallery

Geography

Franklin is located in northern Merrimack County at  (43.446956, −71.656966).

It is drained by the Winnipesaukee, Pemigewasset and Merrimack rivers. Webster Lake is in the north. Franklin lies fully within the Merrimack River watershed.

U.S. Route 3 and New Hampshire Route 11 form Central Street, the main street of Franklin. Heading east, the two routes lead to Tilton and Laconia. US 3 leads south to Boscawen and Concord, while NH 11 goes west to Andover and New London. New Hampshire Route 127 also passes through downtown Franklin, leading southwest to Salisbury and Contoocook, and north into Sanbornton.  New Hampshire Route 3A leads north from West Franklin to Bristol.

Adjacent municipalities 

 Sanbornton (northeast)
 Tilton (east)
 Northfield (southeast)
 Boscawen (south)
 Salisbury (southwest)
 Andover (west)
 Hill (northwest)

Demographics

As of the census of 2010, there were 8,477 people, 3,407 households, and 2,179 families residing in the city. There were 3,938 housing units, of which 531, or 13.5%, were vacant. 193 of the vacant units were for seasonal or recreational use. The racial makeup of the town was 96.2% white, 0.5% African American, 0.5% Native American, 0.8% Asian, 0.02% Native Hawaiian or Pacific Islander, 0.3% some other race, and 1.7% from two or more races. 1.6% of the population were Hispanic or Latino of any race.

Of the 3,407 households, 30.8% had children under the age of 18 living with them, 44.8% were headed by married couples living together, 13.5% had a female householder with no husband present, and 36.0% were non-families. 28.4% of all households were made up of individuals, and 11.8% were someone living alone who was 65 years of age or older. The average household size was 2.43, and the average family size was 2.93.

In the city, 22.3% of the population were under the age of 18, 8.0% were from 18 to 24, 25.6% from 25 to 44, 29.0% from 45 to 64, and 15.1% were 65 years of age or older. The median age was 40.2 years. For every 100 females, there were 91.7 males. For every 100 females age 18 and over, there were 88.9 males.

For the period 2011–2015, the estimated median annual income for a household was $43,237, and the median income for a family was $52,390. Male full-time workers had a median income of $43,179 versus $34,708 for females.  The per capita income for the city was $22,318. 21.1% of the population and 16.6% of families were below the poverty line. 40.2% of the population under the age of 18 and 12.5% of those 65 or older were living in poverty.

Education
 Franklin High School

Sites of interest
 Sulphite Railroad Bridge (the "upside-down" railroad bridge)
 Daniel Webster Birthplace State Historic Site

Notable people 

 Jedh Barker (1945–1967), U.S. Marine; posthumously received the Medal of Honor
 Vaughn Blanchard (1889–1969), Olympic track and field athlete
 Cornelia James Cannon (1876–1969), feminist reformer
 Walter Bradford Cannon (1871–1945), physiologist
 Warren F. Daniell (1826–1913), manufacturer, stock breeder, banker, U.S. congressman
 Ram Dass (1931–2019), spiritual leader (occasional resident)
 John King Fairbank (1907–1991), historian (summer resident)
 Robert Moller Gilbreth (1920–2007), New Hampshire state legislator, educator, businessman
 Robert M. Leach (1879–1952), U.S. congressman
 G. W. Pierce (1872–1956), professor of physics at Harvard University and inventor in the development of electronic telecommunications
 Katherine Call Simonds (1865–1946), musician, dramatic soprano, author, composer
 Daniel Webster (1782–1852), Secretary of State, U.S. senator, congressman

References

External links

 
 Franklin Public Library
 Franklin Historical Society
 Franklin Opera House
 New Hampshire Economic and Labor Market Information Bureau Profile

 
Cities in New Hampshire
Cities in Merrimack County, New Hampshire
Populated places established in 1828
Massachusetts populated places on the Merrimack River
1828 establishments in New Hampshire